Cream were a 1960s British rock power trio consisting of drummer Ginger Baker, guitarist/singer Eric Clapton and bassist/singer Jack Bruce. While together they released four albums, the last two being partly recorded live in concert, and ten singles. Since breaking up there have been four albums of music recorded live in concert (including of their brief reunion at the Royal Albert Hall in 2005), and 11 compilation albums.

Albums

Studio albums

Live albums

Compilation albums

Singles

Videos
 Spoonfull live on TV (1967)
Farewell Concert - VHS, DVD, recorded Royal Albert Hall, November 1968 (UK : Gold)
Strange Brew - largely a re-edit of Farewell Concert plus some outtakes
Fresh Live Cream - VHS, DVD, documentary filmed just after the Rock & Roll Hall of Fame reunion in 1993 containing band interviews and previously unreleased material
Royal Albert Hall London May 2-3-5-6, 2005 - DVD, recorded Royal Albert Hall, May 2005 (UK : Platinum), (US : 5× Platinum)
Cream: Disraeli Gears (2006) - DVD, a reflection on what went into making Disraeli Gears, and the impact it had on the 60s. (UK : Gold)
Cream: Classic Artists - DVD + CD, recorded before and after the Madison Square Garden reunion concerts; features interviews with band members, along with an audio CD containing five previously unreleased tracks from Swedish radio.

References

External links

 
Discographies of British artists
Blues discographies
Rock music group discographies